The 2014–15 Southern Illinois Salukis men's basketball team represented Southern Illinois University Carbondale during the 2014–15 NCAA Division I men's basketball season. The Salukis, led by third year head coach Barry Hinson, played their home games at the SIU Arena and were members of the Missouri Valley Conference. They finished the season 12–21, 4–14 in MVC play to finish in ninth place. They advanced to the quarterfinals of the Missouri Valley tournament where they lost to Wichita State.

Previous season 
The Salukis finished the season 14–19, 9–9 in MVC play to finish in a three way tie for fourth place. They advanced to the semifinals of the Missouri Valley tournament where they lost to Indiana State.

Departures

Incoming Transfers

Recruiting

Roster

Schedule

|-
!colspan=12 style="background:#800000; color:#FFFFFF;"| Exhibition

|-
!colspan=12 style="background:#800000; color:#FFFFFF;"| Regular season
|-

|-
!colspan=12 style="background:#800000; color:#FFFFFF;"| Missouri Valley Conference Games

|-
!colspan=12 style="background:#800000; color:#FFFFFF;"|  Missouri Valley tournament

References

Southern Illinois Salukis men's basketball seasons
Southern Illinois
Southern Illinois Salukis men's basketball
Southern Illinois Salukis men's basketball